Elga Lee Jefferies (born July 10, 1946) is an American politician who served as a Democratic member of the Illinois House of Representatives, representing the 26th District during the 95th Illinois General Assembly. Jeffries' appointment came following the death of the former Representative, Lovana "Lou" Jones; she then proceeded to be elected to her position in November 2006, but was later defeated in the 2008 primary election, finishing third out of five candidates.

Margaret Smith resigned from the Illinois Senate on December 12, 2002. Jefferies was appointed to succeed her from December 19, 2002, until the winner of the November 2002 general election, Mattie Hunter, was sworn in on January 8, 2003.

On June 3, 2006, Jefferies was appointed to succeed the late Lovana Jones. Her agenda during her tenure in the House focused on physical and mental healthcare, affordable housing, and providing access to education for adults who did not complete high school.

Jefferies has been involved in community activities since her young adult years, working with organizations such as the Palmer House for Boys, the Near North Organization, Operation P.U.S.H., the Task Force for Black Empowerment, the National Democratic Organization, and the Bronzeville Merchants Association, serving as Deputy Mayor of Bronzeville. She is a member of the Illinois Legislative Black Caucus.

Jefferies voted "present" in the impeachment of Governor Rod Blagojevich on January 9, 2009.

References 

 Steponenaite, Gabija, "Jefferies ready for full term", The Gazette (Chicago), Nov. 3, 2006.

External links
Illinois General Assembly - Representative Elga L. Jefferies (D) 26th District official IL House website
Bills  Committees
Project Vote Smart - Senator Elga L. Jefferies (IL) profile
Follow the Money - Elga L Jefferies
2006 campaign contributions
Illinois House Democrats - Elga L. Jefferies profile

Members of the Illinois House of Representatives
1946 births
Living people
African-American state legislators in Illinois
African-American women in politics
Politicians from Chicago
Women state legislators in Illinois
21st-century American politicians
21st-century American women politicians
21st-century African-American women
21st-century African-American politicians
20th-century African-American people
20th-century African-American women